The Cold Spring Historic District is a historic district that includes much of the central area of the Hudson River Cold Spring village in Putnam County, New York. It is roughly bounded by Main Street (in the northeastern portion of the village the eastern end of NY 301), Cedar and Fair streets and Paulding Avenue.

It gives Cold Spring its quaint character and has been described as "one of the best-preserved 19th century townscapes in the Hudson River region". A consultants' report for the village's 1987 master plan quotes the National Register of Historic Places saying, upon adding the district in 1982: 

Most of the houses, churches and other buildings came into existence in the years before the Civil War, when the nearby West Point Foundry was at the peak of its production and workers were rapidly moving into the area.
 
Today the district includes over 200 buildings, many of them contributing properties. They have helped transform the village into a popular upscale residence for commuters and weekend destination for New York City residents due to the nearby Metro-North train station offering easy access to Grand Central Terminal.

2005 lawsuit

Like some other municipalities with federally designated historic districts, Cold Spring has added sections to its zoning code to preserve that character. In 2005, a resident, Donald Lusk, filed suit in federal court against the village after it cited him for nonconforming signs he had put up in front of his house in protest of a proposed nearby condominium development. The case went all the way to appeals court, which decided in 2007 that his First Amendment rights had been violated by the process by which his signs were judged nonconforming, which partly considered the content of those signs. However, the ordinances dictating the size, shape and placement of the signs themselves were upheld as permissible regulations of the time, place and manner of speech.

References

External links

Cold Spring Living
Cold Spring Historic District Map (LivingPlaces.com)

Historic districts on the National Register of Historic Places in New York (state)
Hudson River
Historic districts in Putnam County, New York
National Register of Historic Places in Putnam County, New York